Cyclin-dependent kinase 4 inhibitor C is an enzyme that in humans is encoded by the CDKN2C gene.

Function 

The protein encoded by this gene is a member of the INK4 family of cyclin-dependent kinase inhibitors. This protein has been shown to interact with CDK4 or CDK6, and prevent the activation of the CDK kinases, thus function as a cell growth regulator that controls cell cycle G1 progression. Ectopic expression of this gene was shown to suppress the growth of human cells in a manner that appears to correlate with the presence of a wild-type RB1 function. Studies in the knockout mice suggested the roles of this gene in regulating spermatogenesis, as well as in suppressing tumorigenesis. Two alternatively spliced transcript variants of this gene, which encode an identical protein, have been reported.

Interactions 

CDKN2C has been shown to interact with Cyclin-dependent kinase 4 and Cyclin-dependent kinase 6.

References

Further reading

External links 
 
 

Cell cycle regulators